The National Agricultural Research Institute (NARI) is an agency within the Ministry of Agriculture of Eritrea. The institute was used to be known as the Department of Agricultural Research and Human Resources Development (DARHARD).

Divisions and units
Divisions
 Animal Resources Research 
 Crop Development Research
 Natural Resources Management Research
 Agricultural Engineering Research
 Human Resources Development and Training

Units
 Socio Economics Unit
 Planning and Statistics Unit
 Communication and Public Relations Unit

Management
Dr. Iyassu Ghebretatios, Director General of NARI

See also
Eritrea Institute of Technology

References
National Agricultural Research Institutes in Eastern and Central Africa

Agriculture in Eritrea
Government of Eritrea
Research institutes in Eritrea
Agricultural research institutes